George Foster (born June 9, 1980) is a former American football offensive tackle. He was drafted by the Denver Broncos 20th overall in the 2003 NFL Draft. He played college football at Georgia.

Foster was also a member of the Detroit Lions, Cleveland Browns and Omaha Nighthawks.

College career
The 2000 season saw the then sophomore Foster earn the backup left tackle position. He was one of the first men off of the Georgia bench and earned extensive playing time during the season, including Georgia's 37-14 win over Virginia in the Oahu Bowl.

At the conclusion of the 2001 spring drills, George Foster was named as the number one split tackle for the Bulldogs. He started nine games during the 2001 season as Georgia culminated their season against Boston College in the Music City Bowl.

During his senior season in 2002 at the University of Georgia, Foster was part of an offensive line that helped the Bulldogs finish with a #3 national ranking in both major polls and also helped the team win a school record 13 games, including victories in the SEC Championship game and the 2003 Nokia Sugar Bowl. Foster and the offensive line paved the way for the Bulldog offense all season long, as it averaged an SEC-best 32 points per game and garnered an offensive passing efficiency of 138.9. For his efforts, Foster was selected to play in the 2003 Senior Bowl, the NCAA's post-season all-star game.

Professional career

Denver Broncos
Foster was drafted by the Denver Broncos 20th overall in the 2003 NFL Draft.

In 2004, Foster started all 16 games at right tackle and did not miss an offensive snap. Foster was part of a line that set a franchise record by allowing only 15 sacks, breaking the previous best of 22 sacks set in 1971. Foster helped rookie Tatum Bell post the first 100-yard game of his career, marking only the second time in franchise history that three different Broncos have had at least one 100-yard game in a season.

Foster started all 16 games for the Broncos in 2005. He helped block for Mike Anderson who rushed for 1,014 yards and Tatum Bell who rushed for 921 yards. The team gained the second-most rushing yards (2,539) in Bronco history and the second-best rushing offense in the NFL.

Detroit Lions
On March 1, 2007, Foster was traded along with teammate Tatum Bell and a 5th round draft pick to the Detroit Lions in exchange for cornerback Dré Bly. He was released on June 1, 2009.

Cleveland Browns
Foster signed with the Cleveland Browns on June 5, 2009. He was released on August 24.

Omaha Nighthawks
Foster was signed by the Omaha Nighthawks of the United Football League on August 21, 2010. He was re-signed by the team on July 15, 2011.

New Orleans Saints
On August 3, 2011, Foster signed with the New Orleans Saints.

Personal life
Foster is a native of Macon, Georgia. On May 7, 2019, Foster was inducted into the Macon Sports Hall of Fame.

References

External links
Just Sports Stats

1980 births
Living people
Sportspeople from Macon, Georgia
Players of American football from Georgia (U.S. state)
American football offensive tackles
Georgia Bulldogs football players
Denver Broncos players
Detroit Lions players
Cleveland Browns players
Omaha Nighthawks players
New Orleans Saints players